Foul Rift is an unincorporated community and one-time ghost town located within White Township, in Warren County, New Jersey.

History
Foul Rift was named after the rapids along that stretch of the Delaware River.  The community began as campsites, and grew to include summer cottages and year-round rental cottages.

Early settlers to Foul Rift purchased land from Penn's heirs in 1740. The Rifton Mills were built there in 1814 in order to harness the fast flowing water at Foul Rift. In 1856, the mills were destroyed by fire.

Between 2004 and 2006, a series of floods destroyed 24 cottages in Foul Rift.  The remaining four cottages, owned by PPL Corporation, were removed in 2008.

Notable people
 John Insley Blair, entrepreneur, railroad magnate, philanthropist and one of the 19th century's wealthiest men.

References

White Township, New Jersey
Washington Township, Warren County, New Jersey
Ghost towns in New Jersey
Unincorporated communities in Warren County, New Jersey
Unincorporated communities in New Jersey